Bosnia and Herzegovina participated in the Eurovision Song Contest 2007 with the song "Rijeka bez imena" written by Aleksandra Milutinović and Goran Kovačić. The song was performed by Marija Šestić. On 16 January 2007, the Bosnian broadcaster Radio and Television of Bosnia and Herzegovina (BHRT) revealed that they had internally selected Marija Šestić to compete at the 2007 contest in Helsinki, Finland. Her song, "Rijeka bez imena", was presented to the public during a show entitled BH Eurosong 2007 on 5 March 2007.

As one of the ten highest placed finishers in 2006, Bosnia and Herzegovina automatically qualified to compete in the final of the Eurovision Song Contest. Performing as the opening entry for the show in position 1, Bosnia and Herzegovina placed eleventh out of the 24 participating countries with 106 points.

Background

The nation's best placing in the contest was third, which it achieved in 2006 with the song "Lejla" performed by Hari Mata Hari.

The Bosnian national broadcaster, Radio and Television of Bosnia and Herzegovina (BHRT), broadcasts the event within Bosnia and Herzegovina and organises the selection process for the nation's entry. BHRT confirmed their intentions to participate at the 2007 Eurovision Song Contest on 2 November 2006. The internal selection procedure was continued for their 2007 entry.

Before Eurovision

Internal selection 
The broadcaster directly invited composers to submit songs in one of the official languages of Bosnia and Herzegovina up until 29 December 2006. Approximately 30 submissions were received at the closing of the deadline and on 16 January 2007, BHRT announced during a press conference that they had internally selected Marija Šestić to represent Bosnia and Herzegovina in Helsinki. Šestić previously attempted to represent Bosnia and Herzegovina in the Eurovision Song Contest 2005, placing fourth in the national final with the song "In This World". The song to be performed at the contest was also selected internally and was written by Aleksandra Milutinović and Goran Kovačić.

The song, "Rijeka bez imena", was presented during a television special entitled BH Eurosong 2007 on 5 March 2007, which was held at the Sarajevo National Theatre and hosted by Dejan Kukrić and Maja Čengić. The show was broadcast on BHT 1. In addition to the presentation of the song, the show featured guest performances by Croatian singer Petar Grašo, 1998 Croatian Eurovision entrant Danijela Martinović, 2007 Belarusian Eurovision entrant Dmitry Koldun, 2002 and 2007 Macedonian Eurovision entrant Karolina Gočeva, and 2007 Slovenian Eurovision entrant Alenka Gotar. An English language version, Russian language version and Serbian language version of the song were prepared, with the song being performed in Serbian at the Eurovision Song Contest. "Rijeka bez imena" was the first song performed entirely in Serbian that was selected to represent Bosnia and Herzegovina at the Eurovision Song Contest.

Promotion 
Marija Šestić made several appearances across Europe to specifically promote "Rijeka bez imena" as the Bosnian Eurovision entry. Marija Šestić took part in promotional activities in Serbia where she performed "Rijeka bez imena" during the final of the Serbian Eurovision national final Beovizija 2007 on 8 March and appeared in the RTV Pink programme Da predjemo na ti on 26 March. On 1 April, Šestić appeared in and performed during the TVS 1 programme Spet doma in Slovenia. Between 13 and 15 April, Šestić performed during the Songfestivalparty event which was held in Belgium at the D-Club and Popi Café venue in Antwerp and at the Le You venue in Brussels, as well as appearing during the RTL 4 programme Life & Cooking in the Netherlands. She also completed promotional activities in Croatia, Finland, Macedonia and Russia which included several television and radio appearances.

At Eurovision
According to Eurovision rules, all nations with the exceptions of the host country, the "Big Four" (France, Germany, Spain and the United Kingdom) and the ten highest placed finishers in the 2006 contest are required to qualify from the semi-final in order to compete for the final; the top ten countries from the semi-final progress to the final. As one of the ten highest placed finishers in the 2006 contest, Bosnia and Herzegovina automatically qualified to compete in the final on 12 May 2007. In addition to their participation in the final, Bosnia and Herzegovina is also required to broadcast and vote in the semi-final on 10 May 2007.

The semi-final and the final were broadcast in Bosnia and Herzegovina on BHT 1 with commentary by Dejan Kukrić. The Bosnian spokesperson, who announced the Bosnian votes during the final, was Vesna Andree-Zaimović.

Final 
Marija Šestić took part in technical rehearsals on 7 and 8 May, followed by dress rehearsals on 11 and 12 May. During the running order draw for the semi-final and final on 12 March 2007, Bosnia and Herzegovina was placed to perform in position 1 in the final, before the entry from Spain.

The Bosnian performance featured Marija Šestić joined on stage by a male tambura player and four female backing vocalists. As the performance progressed, the tambura player came forward from the back of the stage to kneel before Šestić, the latter who fell into his arms. The stage lighting displayed electric blue colours which transitioned to red, while the LED screens displayed stars which transitioned to faded aqua clouds and ultimately an orange lava river. The mustard dress for Marija Šestić was designed by Verica Rakočević. The tambura player that joined Marija Šestić was Aleksandar Sedlar Bogoev, while the four backing vocalists were: Danijela Večerinović, Dunja Galineo Kajević, Jelena Majić and Marina Đurović. Bosnia and Herzegovina placed eleventh in the final, scoring 106 points.

Voting 
Below is a breakdown of points awarded to Bosnia and Herzegovina and awarded by  Bosnia and Herzegovina in the semi-final and grand final of the contest. The nation awarded its 12 points to Serbia in the semi-final and the final of the contest.

Points awarded to Bosnia and Herzegovina

Points awarded by Bosnia and Herzegovina

References

External links
 Official BH Eurosong 2007 site
 eurobosnia.com

2007
Countries in the Eurovision Song Contest 2007
Eurovision